Konkani Wikipedia is the Konkani language edition of Wikipedia, run by Wikimedia Foundation. It was started in July 2015. Prior to this, it had been in incubation since 2006. Currently, there are  content articles in the project.

History 
Konkani Wikipedia went live in July 2015, after being in incubation since 2006. Earlier in September 2013, 4 volumes of Konkani vishwakosh (encyclopedia) were relicensed under Creative Commons Licenses. Information from these volumes of encyclopedias were used to write articles on Konkani Wikipedia. In the same year a Wikipedia-related workshop was organized at Goa University. In April 2014, two introductory sessions on editing Wikipedia were conducted at Roshni Nilaya School of Social Work in Goa.

In July 2015 the Wikipedia went live after incubation for 9 years. At the time of the official inauguration the Wikipedia contained 2500 articles. The project was supported by Goa University and Nirmala Institute of Education. Late Madhavi Sardesai, then a professor and Head of Department of Konkani at the Goa University, played an important role to launch the project. Prakash Parienkar, the current head of department of Konkani department of Goa University had said at that time:
We will assign projects to our students and writers too, to write articles on different subjects related to Goa and upload them on the Wikipedia. This will include information on local food, its culture, tradition, tourist spots and much more. In January 2016, a one-day edit-a-thon was organized at Krishnadas Shama Central Library, Goa. Rahmanuddin Shaik, a Center for Internet and Society representative trained the participants about Wikipedia editing and policies. Almost 100 articles were created during this one-day event.

Subsequently, the Wikipedia initiatives in Goa have been taken up under the umbrella of the Wikipedians of Goa User Group, which looks at Goa-focussed content and promotion, regardless of language, and has the potential to focus on Konkani Wikipedia also.

Konkani Wiktionary
Another parallel initiative is the Konkani Wiktionary project. It seeks to build an open and shareable Konkani dictionary in cyberspace. As part of its activities, a Wiktionary workshop and meet-ups were held at St. Xavier's College, Mapusa in May 2019 and December 2019. Approved in March, 2020, by the Language Committee of the Wikimedia Foundation, the Konkani Wiktionary moved to its newly created site on 21 May 2020. It has over 2300 entries (in November 2020).

See also 
 Marathi Wikipedia
 Tulu Wikipedia

References

External links 
 

Wikipedias by language
Internet properties established in 2015
Culture of Goa
Indian encyclopedias
21st-century Indian books
Wikipedia in India